The Pulse is a Sirius XM Radio station that plays music from the 2010s to present-day on channel 5 and Dish Network channel 6005.  Every half-hour The Pulse's Jim Ryan or Ron Ross reviews music news on tours, future albums, and other topics covered.

The channel debuted on XM Satellite Radio channel 26 and DirecTV channel 818 on April 17, 2006 as Flight 26 in response to demands by former shareholder Clear Channel Communications (who owns the similarly formatted Mix on channel 22), and was programmed by New York City native Mike Abrams. XM agreed that Clear Channel Communications can add commercials to channels which it already provides programming to, such as KISS, Sunny, and Mix.  In response, XM changed their slogan from "100% commercial-free music" to "the most commercial-free music channels on satellite radio".  In the United States, the newly commercialized channels were moved, whereas they were deleted outright from XM Canada.  XM described Flight 26 as "Modern Hits of the 90s & Now," although since it leaned toward Hot AC, the station played no urban music. The music was targeted for the younger adult group, especially for those who were age 16 or older,  and the station played music from such artists as John Mayer, Jack Johnson, Green Day, The Fray, Avril Lavigne, Uncle Kracker, Lisa Loeb, P!nk, Colbie Caillat, Counting Crows, and Nickelback.  During its tenure as Flight 26, it was XM's second-most-listened-to channel after Top 20 on 20.

On November 12, 2008, during the consolidation of XM and Sirius programming, Flight 26 took The Pulse branding that lived on Sirius channel 9, which aired a 1990s/hot AC hybrid, and that channel number is now The 90s on 9. Also, the new Pulse was added to channel 12 on Sirius Satellite Radio.  As a result, the old Pulse ceased operations due to the fact for the old Pulse ranked #9 in the Sirius ratings, and Flight 26 had higher ratings than the old Pulse. A number of Flight 26 on-air personalities joined The Pulse and continue broadcasting under The Pulse branding. The Bridge (which became Led Zeppelin Radio for two months) forced its move from channel 12 to channel 33 (replacing SIRIUS Disorder).  However, Mediabase reports The Pulse's playlist under X026-FM rather than S012-FM.

The Pulse's imaging was changed to the same voiceover as the old Flight 26 branding rather than carry the old jingles from the old Sirius 9 channel.

Most recently, to encounter sister channel The Blend's overhaul in September 2009, The Pulse dropped most of the 1990s songs that can already be heard on sister channel '90s on 9.  The slogan was also changed to "2000s and today."

Every weekend, The Pulse counts down their top 15 current songs as well as the top 15 Pulse songs that week anywhere from 2010 to 2019. Pat Monahan, lead singer of the band Train, also hosts a weekend show, an hour long of new music discovery songs picked by Pat himself.

After the launch of PopRocks, The Pulse further narrowed its playlist dropping most 2000s songs focusing on currents minus the rap playing a more adult top 40 approach focusing on current hits on the mainstream and hot adult contemporary music mixed with hits from 2010 to today. In early 2018, the Pulse renamed their weekend countdown to "Today's Pulse Top 15", which was formerly known as "2000s and Today Top 15 Countdown". This was due to the fact that the station now focused more on 2010s music.

On November 5, 2021, The Pulse moved from channel 15 to channel 5, replacing '50s on 5. Mosaic took over The Pulse's former slot.

Core artists
Coldplay
P!nk
Rob Thomas
Andy Grammer
Fitz & The Tantrums
Kelly Clarkson
The Goo Goo Dolls
OneRepublic
Lizzo
Ed Sheeran
Lewis Capaldi
John Legend
Sam Smith
Kelsea Ballerini
Steve Lacy

See also
 List of Sirius Satellite Radio stations

References

External links
SiriusXM: The Pulse

Sirius Satellite Radio channels
XM Satellite Radio channels
Sirius XM Radio channels
Hot adult contemporary radio stations in the United States
Adult top 40 radio stations in the United States
Radio stations established in 2006